This is a list of years in Equatorial Guinea.

20th century

21st century

 
History of Equatorial Guinea
Equatorial Guinea
years